Joseph Mansion was a state legislator in Louisiana and served as state tax assessor. He played the violin. He had a cigar store. He was a Republican from Orleans Parish.

References

Year of birth missing
Members of the Louisiana State Legislature
Year of death missing